...Live in Chicago is a live album and concert film by American pop rock band Panic at the Disco. Released on December 2, 2008, it documents the band's performances at the Congress Theater in Chicago, Illinois, on May 23 and 24 on the 2008 Honda Civic Tour. At the time of its release the band dropped the exclamation mark from its band name.

Track listing

CD content
Tracks 1, 3, 4, 6, 7, 8, 9, 11, 13, 15, and 17 written and composed by Ryan Ross.
Tracks 2 and 10 written and composed by Ryan Ross, Jon Walker, Brendon Urie, and Spencer Smith.
Tracks 5, 14, and 16 written and composed by Ryan Ross and Jon Walker.
Track 12 written and composed by Ryan Ross and Brendon Urie.

DVD content
Live performance
In the Days – This is a documentary-like segment which includes a sneak-peek behind the scenes during the Chicago stop on the tour.
Music videos
 "Nine in the Afternoon"
 "That Green Gentleman (Things Have Changed)"
 "Mad as Rabbits"
 "Northern Downpour"
The making of music videos
 "Nine in the Afternoon"
 "That Green Gentleman (Things Have Changed)"
 "Northern Downpour"

Personnel
Panic at the Disco
Ryan Ross – vocals, guitars, tambourine
Brendon Urie – vocals, guitars, tambourine; bass guitar on "Mad as Rabbits"
Jon Walker – bass guitar, backing vocals; guitar on "Mad as Rabbits"
Spencer Smith – drums, percussion, tambourine, backing vocals on "Northern Downpour"

Additional personnel
Eric Ronick (of Black Gold) – keyboards, backing vocals, percussion

References

Panic! at the Disco live albums
Music video compilation albums
2008 live albums
2008 video albums
2008 compilation albums
Fueled by Ramen live albums
Fueled by Ramen video albums
Albums produced by Rob Mathes
Albums produced by Matt Squire
Panic! at the Disco video albums
Fueled by Ramen compilation albums
Panic! at the Disco compilation albums
Decaydance Records live albums
Decaydance Records video albums
Albums recorded at Congress Theater